The Penja are a Muslim community found in the state of Punjab in India and the Punjab province of Pakistan. They are also known as Naddaf, and in Pakistan their preferred designation is Shaikh Mansoori.

Origin 

The Penja like many communities in India have acquired their name from their traditional occupation. In the case of the Penja, they were and many still are cotton carders and produce a coarse thread. They are said to be by origin members of the Teli caste who formed an endogamous sub-group when they changed their occupation from oil pressing to cotton carding. Historically, the Penja community was concentrated in what is now  Indian or East Punjab, which led to the migration of the majority of the community to Pakistan at the time of the partition of India in 1947. A rump community is still found in the districts Ropar, Patiala and Sangrur. In Pakistan, the community is found mainly in Faisalabad, Sahiwal, Khanewal and Toba Tek Singh districts, and prefers to be known as Shaikh Mansoori or sometimes just Shaikh. The Penja speak Punjabi, but most who are now settled in Pakistan also speak Urdu. They are entirely Sunni, and are now fairly orthodox.

Present circumstances 

The Penja historically practiced the custom of clan exogamy. This practice has now been discontinued. Their larger clans referred to as biradarus include the Raunji, Dedan, Phapute, Jand, Harim, Sohatte, Ahre, Kamboh, Bedham, Male Hans, Behlim, Alimi, Bhatti, Chauhan, Panwar and Gill. The Penja are strictly endogamous, but there are occasional marriages with the Teli community.

Like most artisan castes, the Penja have seen a decline in their traditional occupation of cotton carding. With the spread of mechanized textile mills, the demand for their traditional coarse thread has disappeared. Many are now employed as agricultural labourers, with animal husbandry being an important subsidiary occupation. In India, the community has been granted Other Backward Class (OBC) status, which allows the community to avail benefits of the Government of India's affirmative action schemes.

See also 
Mansoori 
 Pinjara

References 

Social groups of Punjab, India
Social groups of Punjab, Pakistan
Punjabi tribes
Muslim communities of India
Shaikh clans